UKNOF (United Kingdom Network Operators' Forum) is an open forum for the exchange of operational and technical information for Internet network operators in the United Kingdom.

Three one-day events are held per year, and are vendor-supported so attendance is free.

UKNOF is notable for including regular Internet history presentations as part of a project to collect information about the history of the UK Internet.

Events are primarily organised by a 17-strong volunteer Programme Committee drawn from UK and international Internet ops community – the people on this committee come from a wide and representative range of organisations: large telcos, mobile operators and IXPs, through to regional and local players and freelance technologists.

The UKNOF legal entity is overseen by a six-person Board of Directors, guided by an Advisory Committee.

References

External links
 

Information technology organisations based in the United Kingdom
Internet in the United Kingdom
Internet Network Operators' Groups